Tillandsia cacticola is a species in the genus Tillandsia, endemic to Peru.

Cultivars
 Tillandsia 'Splendid'

References

cacticola
Endemic flora of Peru
Plants described in 1954